Correctional Services of Solomon Islands (CSSI) is the correctional agency of the government of the Solomon Islands. It was previously known as the Solomon Islands Prison Service (SIPS).

Facilities 
Construction on the Gizo Correctional Centre in Gizo, Western Province began in December 2010.

The service also operates the Auki Correctional Centre in Auki, Malaita Province. The prison, newly constructed as of 2009, can house up to 60 prisoners. It has dedicated space for women and juvenile prisoners.

References

External links

 Corrections." Regional Assistance Mission to Solomon Islands.

Prison and correctional agencies
Penal system in the Solomon Islands